Dominique Bockelée-Morvan (born 1957) is a French astrophysicist and planetary scientist specializing in the molecular composition of comets.  She is a director of research for the French National Centre for Scientific Research (CNRS), affiliated with the Paris Observatory, and a former president of Commission 15 on the Physical Study of Comets & Minor Planets of the International Astronomical Union.

Education and career
Bockelée-Morvan earned a doctorate in 1987 through Paris Diderot University, with the dissertation Les conditions d'excitation des molecules meres dans les atmospheres cometaires : applications a l'eau et a l'acide cyanhydrique, supervised by Jacques Crovisier.

She was president of Commission 15 on the Physical Study of Comets & Minor Planets of the International Astronomical Union, from 2012 to 2015.

Research
Bockelée-Morvan brought the study of comets from a (literally) dusty backwater of planetary science into the mainstream.
Through infrared and radio observations of comets, and the development of excitation models for cometary chemicals, she has found over 20 different molecular impurities in their ice. Her work found connections between the makeup of comets and of the interstellar medium, and with prebiotic chemistry. She has also helped explain the 3.4 µm-wavelength emissions of comets.

She has been a collaborator on the MIRO and VIRTIS experiments on the Rosetta space probe and its 2014 flyby study of comet 67P/Churyumov–Gerasimenko. Beyond comets, she has also contributed to the first discovery of water vapor on the asteroid Ceres.

Recognition
She won the young researcher prize of the Société Française d'Astronomie et d'Astrophysique (SF2A) in 1992.

She received the David Bates Medal of the European Geosciences Union in 2002, "for her exceptional observations and interpretations of the composition of comets". She received the CNRS Silver Medal in 2014.

Asteroid 4020 Dominique, discovered in 1981, was named after Bockelée-Morvan.

Selected publications

References

1957 births
Living people
French astrophysicists
Planetary scientists
Women planetary scientists
French women scientists
Research directors of the French National Centre for Scientific Research